Chiochiș is a commune in Bistrița-Năsăud County, Transylvania, Romania. It is composed of ten villages: Apatiu (Dellőapáti), Bozieș (Magyarborzás), Buza Cătun (Buzaifogadók), Chețiu (Ketel), Chiochiș, Jimbor (Szászzsombor), Manic (Mányik), Sânnicoară (Aranyosszentmiklós), Strugureni (Mezőveresegyháza; Rothkirch), and Țentea (Cente).

Geography
The commune lies on the Transylvanian Plateau, on the banks of the river Apatiu and its tributary, the river Beudiu.

Demographics
At the 2011 census, 73.2% of the population were Romanians, 24.1% Hungarians and 2.5% Roma. At the 2002 census, 68.7% were Romanian Orthodox, 22.1% Reformed, 4% Pentecostal, 2% Baptist, and 1.8% Greek-Catholic.

Natives
  (1875–1959), botanist
 Cornelia Filipaș (born 1926), communist politician

Places of interest
The following churches are situated in the commune:

 
 
 
 
 
 

On the western side of the village of Manic there is a string of lakes, set up in 1980; the lakes are rich in Prussian carp.

References

Communes in Bistrița-Năsăud County
Localities in Transylvania